Gainford railway station is a disused station in Gainford, County Durham, North East England, on the Darlington and Barnard Castle Railway.

On 24 October 1905 there was an accident between Gainford and Winston at Grand bank near Tees Bridge in which 2 NER 0-6-0 engines were derailed when they ran onto track where a rail had been removed for maintenance.

References

External links
 Gainford at disused-stations.org,uk

Disused railway stations in County Durham
Gainford, County Durham